Horst H. Berger (born March 30, 1933) is a German electrical engineer noted for his contributions to semiconductor technologies for integrated circuits.

Berger was born in Liegnitz (Legnica), Lower Silesia, and received the Vordiplom. from the Technische Hochschule of Dresden, then worked at the IBM Laboratories in Böblingen. Afterwards he became a researcher and teacher at the Technical University of Berlin.

Together with Siegfried K. Wiedmann, Berger received the 1977 IEEE Morris N. Liebmann Memorial Award "for the invention and exploration of the Merged Transistor Logic, MTL".

Selected works 
 H. H. Berger and S. K. Wiedmann, "Merged-Transistor Logic (MTL) – A Low-Cost Bipolar Logic Concept",  IEEE Journal of Solid-State Circuits, vol. SC-7, No. 5, Oct. 1972, pp. 340–346.

References 
 Fruchtbare Quelle: Horst Berger wurde 70 (German)
 Contributors, IEEE Journal of Solid-State Circuits, Volume 7, Issue 5, pages 435–440. October 1972.

1933 births
Living people
People from Legnica
German electrical engineers
IBM employees
People from the Province of Lower Silesia
Academic staff of the Technical University of Berlin
Computer hardware engineers
Semiconductor technology